"Tell Me Why" is a popular song, written by Titus Turner in 1956. It is a slow, strong rhythm and blues ballad, and has a melody reminiscent of "Just a Closer Walk With Thee".

The first hit version was by Marie Knight, a black R&B singer, on the Mercury's subsidiary label, Wing. It was a local hit in  New Orleans and Texas. When it attracted attention, it went on to become a moderate hit for Gale Storm and The Crew-Cuts in 1956 and for Elvis Presley in 1966. Presley recorded the track in 1957, but it was not released at that time. It was issued in late 1965 during a period in which his label, RCA Victor, was issuing previously unreleased archival recordings, to make up for the fact Presley was, at the time, recording exclusively film soundtracks (see the 1965 album, Elvis for Everyone! which includes another 1957 outtake and one track dating back to 1954). It reached number 33 on the Billboard Hot 100 and became a gold record.

Billboard described the Presley's version as a "slow blues rocker [that] is revived and released in the U.S. with top of the chart action anticipated," after being a "proven hit" in England. The track reached number 15 on the UK Singles Chart in December 1965.

References

1956 singles
Elvis Presley songs
Rhythm and blues songs
Songs written by Titus Turner
1956 songs
1950s ballads